The High Commissioner of the Trust Territory of the Pacific Islands was an official who administered the Trust Territory of the Pacific Islands (TTPI), a United Nations trusteeship in the Pacific Ocean under the administration of the United States, between 1947 and 1994. The territory consisted of islands captured by America during World War II, prior to which they had been part of the Empire of Japan as the South Seas Mandate, within the Japanese colonial empire. After World War II, United Nations Security Council Resolution 21 placed the territory under the United States trusteeship as the Trust Territory of the Pacific Islands. The islands are now part of Palau, Northern Mariana Islands, Federated States of Micronesia, and Marshall Islands.

List
The following is a list of the High Commissioner of the Trust Territory of the Pacific Islands, as well as their predecessors during the American occupation of the territory between 1944 and 1947.

(Dates in italics indicate de facto continuation of office)

Palau
 Palau continued to be administered by the Office of Territorial and International Affairs (presently the Office of Insular Affairs), a unit of the United States Department of the Interior until May 25, 1994.

Notes

See also
 Governor of the South Seas Mandate
 Congress of the Trust Territory of the Pacific Islands

External links
 World Statesmen – Micronesia (Trust Territory of the Pacific Islands)

References

 
Trust Territory of the Pacific Islands, High Commissioner
Lists of office-holders
Trust Territory of the Pacific Islands, High Commissioner
Trust Territory of the Pacific Islands, High Commissioner
Trust Territory of the Pacific Islands